The Kincade Fire was a wildfire that burned in Sonoma County, California in the United States. The fire started northeast of Geyserville in The Geysers on 9:24 p.m. on October 23, 2019, and subsequently burned  until the fire was fully contained on November 6, 2019. The fire threatened over 90,000 structures and caused widespread evacuations throughout Sonoma County, including the communities of Geyserville, Healdsburg, Windsor, and Santa Rosa. The majority of Sonoma County and parts of Lake County were under evacuation warnings and orders. Lake county only had one evacuation order and that was the town of Middletown. The fire was the largest of the 2019 California wildfire season, and also the largest wildfire recorded in Sonoma County at the time before being surpassed by the LNU Lightning Complex fires in 2020.

The fire
The Kincade Fire was reported burning at John Kincade Road and Burned Mountain Road in The Geysers, northeast of Geyserville, California, at 9:57 PM on October 23, 2019. The fire started at 9:24 PM during an extreme wind event.

A compulsory report shows that the fire started when a 230,000 volt transmission line failed near the point of origin, just as power was about to be shut off in the area. On October 26, PG&E began shutting off power in an attempt to prevent additional fires, leaving an estimated three million people without power. On October 28, the California Public Utilities Commission announced an investigation into the shutoffs.

"Despite the latest shutdowns, PG&E admitted last week that its equipment may have started the Kincade fire," said the San Jose Mercury News in an editorial condemning the utility's practices and calling for regulatory action. "

Impact 

Eighty thousand more structures were threatened by the fire, and PG&E said it had cut off power to more than a million customers. According to the Federal Communications Commission, hundreds of cell phone towers were down because of power shutoffs. The Soda Rock Winery in Healdsburg was destroyed and the Field Stone Vineyard was heavily damaged.

Evacuations
On October 26, compulsory evacuations had been issued for 90,000 people. As the fire spread, by October 27, evacuation orders and warnings grew to encompass nearly all of Sonoma County, including about 190,000 people, making it the largest evacuation ever in Sonoma County. Many people were forced to flee in the darkness due to ongoing power shutoffs in the region.

The Sonoma County government, in conjunction with Esri, published an interactive map containing incidents and evacuation zones associated with the fires.

Utilities 

In the early weeks of the fire, PG&E initiated a massive power shut-off to nearly 940,000 customers by October 26, with a projected total number of customers impacted to be close to 2.5 to 2.8 million. There were to be six phases of power shutoff between October 26 and 27. The outages did not go over well. "The issue isn't even all of the power shutoffs," said Mendocino County chief executive Carmel Angelo. "It's the lack of communication."

Sonoma–Marin Area Rail Transit commuter rail offered free service between October 30 and November 6 initially as far north as Downtown Santa Rosa, then eventually on the whole line for those needing transportation alternatives.

Fire growth and containment progress

Cause of the fire
Initially, it was unknown whether or not PG&E was at fault for the fire. In a filing with the Securities and Exchange Commission (SEC), PG&E estimated a minimum loss of $600 million before available insurance. On July 16, 2020, which was after PG&E exited bankruptcy, Cal Fire reported that the fire was caused by PG&E transmission lines. Cal Fire did not make the report public, but forwarded the investigation report to the Sonoma County District Attorney's Office for further investigation. Wildfire victims filed a civil lawsuit for damages caused by the fire. Damages would not be covered by the settlement for wildfire victims that was part of the PG&E bankruptcy.

See also
 2019 California wildfires
 Tick Fire

References

External links

2019 California wildfires
October 2019 events in the United States
Wildfires in Sonoma County, California